The 1975 Tangerine Bowl was a college football bowl game played on December 20, 1975, at the Tangerine Bowl stadium in Orlando, Florida. The game featured the South Carolina Gamecocks and the Miami Redskins (located in Oxford, Ohio and now nicknamed the RedHawks).

Background
Miami had won their third straight Mid-American Conference (MAC) title, accumulating a record of 31–1–1 over three seasons. As for South Carolina, this was their first bowl game since the 1969 Peach Bowl.

Game summary
Miami scored two touchdowns in the first half, for a 14–0 lead at halftime.  South Carolina got no closer than 17–7 in the third quarter, with Miami adding one more field goal in the fourth quarter, for a 20–7 final score. Miami tailback Rob Carpenter rushed for 120 yards on 29 carries and was named the game's outstanding offensive player, while his teammate Jeff Kelly was named outstanding defensive player.

Scoring summary

Aftermath
Miami's next bowl appearance was the 1986 California Bowl, and they have not returned to the Citrus Bowl since this game. South Carolina's next bowl appearance was the 1979 Hall of Fame Classic.  More than fifteen years later they returned to the Citrus Bowl, which had changed names and was the 2012 Capital One Bowl.

Statistics

References

Tangerine Bowl
Citrus Bowl (game)
Miami RedHawks football bowl games
South Carolina Gamecocks football bowl games
Tangerine Bowl
Tangerine Bowl